Operation V150, where 150 refers to a target speed in metres per second, was a series of high-speed trials carried out on the LGV Est. The V150 was a specially configured TGV high-speed train (weighing only ) notable for breaking the world railway speed record on 3 April 2007.

Record of 2007 

Operation V150 trials were carried out on the LGV Est prior to its June 2007 opening. The trials were conducted jointly by SNCF, TGV builder Alstom, and LGV Est owner Réseau Ferré de France between 15 January 2007 and 15 April 2007.  Following a series of increasingly high-speed runs, the official speed record attempt took place on 3 April 2007.  The top speed of) was reached at kilometre point 191 near the village of Le Chemin, between the Meuse and Champagne-Ardenne TGV stations, where the most favorable profile exists.

V150 record train

The train used for the speed record was code named V150, and comprised three modified Duplex cars, fitted with two powered bogies similar to the AGV prototype, marshalled between a pair of TGV power cars from POS trainset 4402. This unusual composition was used to obtain high speed test data on disparate technical elements including the new asynchronous traction motors on the POS power cars, the lightweight synchronous permanent magnet traction motors on the AGV bogies, the actively controlled pantograph, and the Duplex bi-level configuration which had never been used in very high speed trials.

Aerodynamic improvements, similar to the 1990 record train, were refined in a wind tunnel and provided a 15% reduction in drag from the standard configuration. These improvements included a front air dam, roof fairings over the pantograph openings, membranes to cover the space between the cars, and a flush-mounted windshield. Over 600 sensors were fitted on various parts of both the engines and the cars.

Test track

The record runs took place on a  section of track 1 on the LGV Est, usually heading west, between kilometre posts 264 (town of Prény) and 120 (near the Champagne-Ardenne TGV station). This section of the LGV was chosen for its vertical profile and gentle curves, with favorable downhill segments leading to the highest speeds between kilometre posts 195 and 191, near the border between the Meuse and Marne departments. The track superelevation was increased to support higher speeds. Catenary voltage was increased to 31 kV from the standard 25 kV. The mechanical tension in the wire was increased to 40 kN from the standard 25 kN. Several measurement stations were installed along the test tracks to monitor stresses in the track and ballast, noise, aerodynamic effects, and catenary dynamics. Between kilometre posts 223 and 167, where speeds exceeded , the track was under close surveillance.

Record runs

For each high speed run, another TGV performed a sweep of the track before the V150 train was cleared to start. This sweep was performed at a sustained —the peak speed reached in the record of 1981—by TGV POS trainset 4404 in a standard eight-car configuration. During certain runs, including the official record run, the V150 train was chased by an Aérospatiale Corvette airplane to provide data relay and uplink of live television images.

See also 

 Land speed record for railed vehicles
 TGV
 LGV construction

References

External links
 INA (Institut national de l'audiovisuel) - Here you can find many videos of TGV records
  Video of the record being broken - DailyMotion.com

Land speed record rail vehicles
TGV trainsets
High-speed trains of France
Experimental and prototype high-speed trains
Electric multiple units with locomotive-like power cars

fr:Records du monde de vitesse sur rail en France#Rame d'essai 4402 (V150)